Carters Cove is an unincorporated community in Gloucester County, in the U. S. state of Virginia. To the inhabitants of Carters Cove it is known as "The Cove" or just "Cove".

References

Unincorporated communities in Virginia
Unincorporated communities in Gloucester County, Virginia